The Blazer 23 is a Canadian trailerable sailboat that was designed by Bruce Kirby as racer-cruiser and first built in 1988.

The Blazer 23 is a cruising development of the Sonar, using the same hull design, but with a larger cabin with ports and a commensurately smaller cockpit, but slightly more sail area. It is very similar to the Kirby 23.

Production
The design was built by Ontario Yachts in Canada, starting in 1988, but it is now out of production.

Design
The Blazer 23 is a recreational keelboat, built predominantly of fibreglass, with wood trim. It has a fractional sloop rig, a raked stem, a slightly reverse transom, a skeg-mounted rudder controlled by a tiller and a fixed fin keel. It displaces  and carries  of lead ballast.

The boat is normally fitted with a small  outboard motor for docking and manoeuvring.

The design has sleeping accommodation for four people, with a double "V"-berth in the bow cabin and two straight settees in the main cabin. The galley is located on both sides, just aft of the bow cabin. The galley is equipped with a two-burner stove on the starboard side and a sink on the port side. The head is located under the bow cabin "V"-berth.

For safety the design is equipped with foam flotation.

Operational history
In a 2010 review Steve Henkel wrote that the boat provides, "exceptionally spritely performance in light and moderate air. Foam flotation for safety is also a plus. Worst features: Low profile and an extra-long cockpit result in a short, low cabin with significantly less accommodation space than the Blazer's comp[etitor]s. Due to her deep draft and deep, nonfolding rudder, using a hoist rather than a ramp for launching is a virtual necessity."

See also
List of sailing boat types

Related development
Kirby 23
Sonar (keelboat)

References

Keelboats
1980s sailboat type designs
Sailing yachts
Trailer sailers
Sailboat types built in Canada
Sailboat type designs by Bruce Kirby
Sailboat types built by Ontario Yachts